Marling is a comune (municipality) in South Tyrol in northern Italy, located about  northwest of Bolzano.

Geography 

Marling borders the following municipalities: Tscherms, Algund, Lana, Merano and Partschins.

History

Coat-of-arms
The shield is argent a fess azure and a gules rampant lion. These are the arms of the Lords of Marling who lived in two castles in the village until 1426. The emblem was adopted in 1966.

Society

Linguistic distribution
According to the 2011 census, 86.41% of the population speak German, 13.41% Italian and 0.17% Ladin as first language.

Demographic evolution

References

External links
 Homepage of the municipality

Municipalities of South Tyrol